Apostolepis christineae is a species of snake in the family Colubridae. It is found in Brazil and Bolivia.

References 

christineae
Reptiles described in 2002
Reptiles of Brazil
Reptiles of Bolivia